The Oldest Dryas is a biostratigraphic subdivision layer corresponding to a relatively abrupt climatic cooling event, or stadial, which occurred during the last glacial retreat. The time period to which the layer corresponds is poorly defined and varies between regions, but it is generally dated as starting at 18.5–17 thousand years (ka) before present (BP) and ending 15–14 ka BP. As with the Younger and Older Dryas events, the stratigraphic layer is marked by abundance of the pollen and other remains of Dryas octopetala, an indicator species that colonizes arctic-alpine regions.

In the Alps, the Oldest Dryas corresponds to the Gschnitz stadial of the Würm glaciation. The term was originally defined specifically for terrestrial records in the region of Scandinavia, but has come to be used both for ice core stratigraphy in areas across the world, and to refer to the time period itself and its associated temporary reversal of the glacial retreat.

Flora

During the Oldest Dryas, Europe was treeless and similar to the Arctic tundra, but much drier and grassier than the modern tundra. It contained shrubs and herbaceous plants such as the following:
Poaceae, grasses
Artemisia
Betula nana, dwarf birch
Salix retusa, dwarf willow
Dryas octopetala

Fauna

Species were mainly Arctic but during the Glacial Maximum, the warmer weather species had withdrawn into refugia and began to repopulate Europe in the Oldest Dryas.

The brown bear, Ursus arctos, was among the first to arrive in the north. Genetic studies indicate North European brown bears came from a refugium in the Carpathians of Moldavia. Other refugia were in Italy, Spain and Greece.

The bears would not have returned north except in pursuit of food. The tundra must already have been well populated. It is likely that the species hunted by humans at Lake Neuchâtel in Switzerland by the end of the period were present during it. Here are other animals present:

Aves
Gavia arctica, black-throated diver
Podiceps nigricollis, black-necked grebe
Cygnus cygnus, whooper swan
Aquila chrysaetos, golden eagle

The above birds are primarily maritime. They must have fed in the copious glacial waters of the north that were just beginning to be released.

Fish
Lota lota, burbot
Thymallus thymallus, grayling
Rutilus rutilus, roach
Salmo trutta, trout
Salvelinus alpinus, char

The smaller mammals of the food chain inhabited the herbaceous blanket of the tundra:

Cricetidae
Discrotonyx torquatus, collared lemming
Microtus oeconomus, root vole
Microtus arvalis, common vole
Chionmys nivalis, snowy vole

Leporidae
Lepus timidus, Arctic hare

Sciuridae
Marmota marmota, marmot

In addition to bears and birds were other predators of the following small animals:

Carnivora
Felis lynx, lynx
Alopex lagopus, Arctic fox
Canis lupus, wolf

Humans were interested in the large mammals, which included:
Rangifer tarandus, reindeer
Equus ferus, wild horse
Capra ibex, ibex

At some point, the larger mammals arrived: hyena, woolly rhinoceros, cave bear and mammoth.

See also 
 Older Dryas
 Younger Dryas

Notes

References

Further reading
 Ehlers, Gibbard, Hughes (eds) (2011) Quaternary Glaciations - Extent and Chronology: A Closer Look Elsevier 
 Bradley, Raymond S. (2013) Paleoclimatology: Reconstructing Climates of the Quaternary Academic Press

External links
the Holocene
High-resolution studies of lake sediments
Glaciers and Climate in Western Austria
Late Glacial Shetland
Chronology of Climatic Change During the Last Deglaciation
Late Glacial Ice Advances in Maritime Canada
The Venus of Neuchatel
Brown Bears

Chronology
Holocene
Ice ages
Last Glacial Period
Climate history
Pleistocene
Paleoclimatology
Palynology
Blytt–Sernander system
Historical eras